The stone pine, botanical name Pinus pinea, also known as the Italian stone pine, Mediterranean stone pine, umbrella pine and parasol pine, is a tree from the pine family (Pinaceae). The tree is native to the Mediterranean region, occurring in Southern Europe and the Levant. The species was introduced into North Africa millennia ago, and is also naturalized in the Canary Islands, South Africa and New South Wales.

Stone pines have been used and cultivated for their edible pine nuts since prehistoric times. They are widespread in horticultural cultivation as ornamental trees, planted in gardens and parks around the world. This plant has gained the Royal Horticultural Society's Award of Garden Merit.

Pinus pinea is a diagnostic species of the vegetation class Pinetea halepensis.

Distribution

The prehistoric range of Pinus pinea included North Africa in the Sahara Desert and Maghreb regions during a more humid climate period, in present-day Morocco, Algeria, Tunisia, and Libya. Its contemporary natural range is in the Mediterranean forests, woodlands, and scrub biome ecoregions and countries, including the following:

Southern Europe

The Iberian conifer forests ecoregion of the Iberian Peninsula in Spain and Portugal; the Italian sclerophyllous and semideciduous forests ecoregion in France and Italy; the Tyrrhenian-Adriatic sclerophyllous and mixed forests ecoregion of southern Italy, Sicily, and Sardinia; the Illyrian deciduous forests of the eastern coast of the Ionian and Adriatic Seas in Croatia and Albania; the Crimean Submediterranean forest complex ecoregion on the Crimea Peninsula in Ukraine and Krasnodar Krai in Russia; and the Aegean and Western Turkey sclerophyllous and mixed forests ecoregion of the southern Balkan Peninsula in Greece. In many parts of northern Italy, large parks with pine trees were laid out by the sea. Examples are the Pineta of Jesolo and Barcola, the Urban Beach of Trieste.

In Greece, although the species is not widely distributed, an extensive stone pine forest exists in western Peloponnese at Strofylia on the peninsula separating the Kalogria Lagoon from the Mediterranean Sea. Currently, Pinus halepensis is outcompeting stone pines in many locations of the forest. Another location in Greece is at Koukounaries on the northern Aegean island of Skiathos at the southwest corner of the island. This is a half-mile-long dense stand of stone and Aleppo pines that lies between a lagoon and the Aegean Sea.

Western Asia
In Western Asia, the Eastern Mediterranean conifer-sclerophyllous-broadleaf forests ecoregion in Turkey; and the Southern Anatolian montane conifer and deciduous forests ecoregion in Turkey, Syria, Lebanon, Israel and in the Palestinian Territories.
Northern Africa
The Mediterranean woodlands and forests ecoregion of North Africa, in Morocco and Algeria.
South Africa
In the Western Cape Province, the pines were according to legend planted by the French Huguenot refugees who settled at the Cape of Good Hope during the late 17th century and who brought the seeds with them from France. The tree is known in the Afrikaans language as kroonden.

Description

The stone pine is a coniferous evergreen tree that can exceed  in height, but  is more typical. The bark is thick, red-brown and deeply fissured into broad vertical plates.

Foliage
Juvenile leaves are also produced in regrowth following injury, such as a broken shoot, on older trees.

The wing is ineffective for wind dispersal, and the seeds are animal-dispersed, originally mainly by the Iberian magpie, but in recent history largely by humans.

Use

Food
Pinus pinea has been cultivated extensively for at least 6,000 years for its edible pine nuts, which have been trade items since early historic times. The tree has been cultivated throughout the Mediterranean region for so long that it has naturalized, and is often considered native beyond its natural range.

Ornamental

The tree is among the current symbols of Rome. It was first planted in Rome during the Roman Republic, where many historic Roman roads, such as the Via Appia, were (and still are) embellished with lines of stone pines. Stone pines were planted on the hills of the Bosphorus strait in Istanbul for ornamental purposes during the Ottoman period. In Italy, the stone pine has been an aesthetic landscape element since the Italian Renaissance garden period. In the 1700s, P. pinea began being introduced as an ornamental tree to other Mediterranean climate regions of the world, and is now often found in gardens and parks in South Africa, California, and Australia. It has naturalized beyond cities in South Africa to the extent that it is listed as an invasive species there. It is also planted in western Europe up to southern Scotland, and on the East Coast of the United States up to New Jersey.

In the United Kingdom it has won the Royal Horticultural Society's Award of Garden Merit.

Small specimens are used for bonsai, and also grown in large pots and planters.

Other
Other products of economic value include resin, bark for tannin extraction, and empty pine cone shells for fuel. Pinus pinea is also currently widely cultivated around the Mediterranean for environmental protection such as consolidation of coastal dunes, soil conservation and protection of coastal agricultural crops.

Pests
The introduced western conifer seed bug (Leptoglossus occidentalis) was accidentally imported with timber to northern Italy in the late 1990s from western USA, and has spread across Europe as an invasive pest species since then. It feeds on the sap of developing conifer cones throughout its life, and its sap-sucking causes the developing seeds to wither and misdevelop. It has destroyed most of the pine nut seeds in Italy, threatening P. pinea in its native habitats there.

Pestalotiopsis pini (a genus of ascomycete fungi), was found as an emerging pathogen on Pinus pine in Portugal. Evidence of shoot blight and stem necrosis were found in stone pine orchards and urban areas in 2020. The edible pine nut production has been decreasing (in the effected area), due to several factors, including pests and diseases. The fungus was found on needles, shoots and trunks of Pinus pinea and also on Pinus pinaster. Pestalotiopsis fungal species could represent a threat to the health of pine forests within the Mediterranean basin.

Gallery

References

External links

 Pinus pinea − distribution map, genetic conservation units and related resources. European Forest Genetic Resources Programme (EUFORGEN)
  The Gymnosperm Database
 efri.gov.tr: A case study on stone pine farms in Turkey

Pinus
Pinus taxa by common names
Edible nuts and seeds
Flora of Southeastern Europe
Flora of Southwestern Europe
Flora of Western Asia
Trees of Mediterranean climate
Least concern plants
Plants described in 1753
Garden plants of Asia
Garden plants of Europe
Ornamental trees
Flora of the Mediterranean Basin